"I'm in Love"  is a song by American recording artist Ginuwine. It was co-written and produced by Troy Oliver for his fifth studio album Back II Da Basics (2005). Released as the second and final single from the album, it reached number 69 on the US Hot R&B/Hip-Hop Songs chart.

Credits and personnel
Credits lifted from the liner notes of Back II Da Basics.

Jimmy Douglass – mixing engineer
Ginuwine – vocals, writer
Troy Oliver – producer, writer
Jonathan Shorten – keyboards

Charts

References

2006 singles
Ginuwine songs
Songs written by Troy Oliver
Songs written by Ginuwine
Song recordings produced by Troy Oliver